Dhan Dhana Dhan is a 2011 Kannada film in the romance genre starring Prem Kumar and Sharmila Mandre. The film is directed by Ramnath Rigvedi. K. Sai Karthik is the music director of the film. Santhosh Singh has jointly produced the film with Wasim. D. This film is a remake of Hum Kisise Kum Naheen.

Cast
 Prem Kumar as Prem
 Sharmila Mandre as Charmi
 Ravishankar Gowda
 Adi Lokesh

Soundtrack
Sai Karthik has set the tunes to the lyrics of Kaviraj and Ramanarayan

Reception

Critical response 

B S Srivani from Deccan Herald wrote "Adi Lokesh fails to bring out the vulnerability of a don in love, unlike Sanjay Dutt. Prem never settles down, while Sharmila looks pretty but little else. Ravishankar’s loud outburst can only sustain interest to a point. Dhan Dhana Dhan won’t be missed at all. What a pity!". Shruti Indira Lakshminarayana from Rediff.com scored the film at 1.5 out of 5 stars and says "Director Ramanath Rigvedi, who had a winner in Budhhivanta, falls flat this time.  Dhan Dhana Dhan is a failed attempt as a family entertainer. Look elsewhere for movie, masti and magic!" A critic from News18 India wrote "How Prem uses his intelligence to thwart off the attempts of the doctor and the mafia forms the climax of the story. "Dhan Dhana Dhan" is a tedious watch, better avoid it".

References 

2011 films
2010s Kannada-language films
Kannada remakes of Hindi films
Films scored by Sai Karthik